A total lunar eclipse took place on 10 December 2011. It was the second of two total lunar eclipses in 2011, the first having occurred on June 15. A lunar eclipse occurs when the moon is positioned just right in its orbit to pass through Earth's shadow.

Visibility 

Asia, Australia, and other areas of the Pacific had the best visibility. European countries only saw a partial eclipse of a rising moon, while northwestern North America saw a partial eclipse of a setting moon.

The eclipse was seen over the Philippines despite cloudy and rainy weather over parts of Luzon and other areas. Photos were taken by groups of amateur astronomers from the Astronomical League of the Philippines (ALP).

South America and portions of West Africa missed the eclipse completely as it happened in the early morning.

Gallery 
Asia

Australia and Oceania

Europe and Middle East

North America

Contact timing by location

Times for Australia 

The eclipse occurred on Saturday evening in Australia. Eastern Daylight Saving Time: (+11:00 UTC)
 Penumbral Eclipse Begins: 22:33:32 EDST
 Partial Eclipse Begins: 23:45:42 EDST
 Total Eclipse Begins: 01:06:16 EDST
 Greatest Eclipse: 01:31:49 EDST
 Total Eclipse Ends: 01:57:24 EDST
 Partial Eclipse Ends: 03:17:58 EDST
 Penumbral Eclipse Ends: 04:30:00 EDST

Times for India 

The eclipse was visible from India in the evening, given in India Standard Time (UTC+5:30):
 Penumbral eclipse begins (P1): 17:04 IST
 Partial eclipse begins (U1): 18:16 IST
 Total eclipse begins (U2): 19:36 IST
 Mid-eclipse: 20:02 IST
 Total eclipse ends (U3): 20:27 IST
 Partial eclipse ends (U4): 21:48 IST
 Penumbral eclipse ends (P4): 23:00 IST

Times for North America 

The eclipse was visible on Saturday morning before sunrise over North America. For most location the moon set before full lunar eclipse. Only Alaska and northernmost Canada will be able to witness the entire event.

Related eclipses

Eclipses of 2011 
 A partial solar eclipse on 4 January.
 A partial solar eclipse on 1 June.
 A total lunar eclipse on 15 June.
 A partial solar eclipse on 1 July.
 A partial solar eclipse on 25 November.
 A total lunar eclipse on 10 December.

It was preceded by the partial solar eclipse of November 25, 2011.

Half-Saros cycle
A lunar eclipse will be preceded and followed by solar eclipses by 9 years and 5.5 days (a half saros). This lunar eclipse is related to two total solar eclipses of Solar Saros 142.

Lunar year (354 days) 
This eclipse is the one of four lunar eclipses in a short-lived series. The lunar year series repeats after 12 lunations or 354 days (shifting back about 10 days in sequential years). Because of the date shift, the Earth's shadow will be about 11 degrees west in sequential events.

See also 
List of lunar eclipses and List of 21st-century lunar eclipses
December 2010 lunar eclipse
June 2011 lunar eclipse
 :File:2011-12-10 Lunar Eclipse Sketch.gif Chart

References

External links 

 
 https://science.nasa.gov/science-news/science-at-nasa/2011/02dec_lunareclipse/
 Hermit eclipse: 2011-12-10
 NightSkyInfo.com : 10 December 2011 Lunar Eclipse
 ShadowAndSubstance.com Animation and time tables for US time zones
 Sharypic World Contributions Gallery
 SpaceWeather.com photo album
Live Webcasts

Amateur Astronomers Association Delhi
 Astronomers Without Borders 
Live webcast of 10 Dec Lunar Eclipse
Night Skies Networks
Live webcast of 10 Dec Lunar Eclipse
SEMS University of North Dakota SEMS project 3 minutes of totality from Grand Forks.
SWAN from India.
Live Webcast of 10 Dec Lunar Eclipse
Lunar Eclipse over the Colorado Rocky Mountains

2011-12
2011 in science
Articles containing video clips
December 2011 events